The Minister for Mental Health is a minister in the New South Wales Government with responsibility for hospitals and health services in regional New South Wales, Australia.

It was first established in 2005 in the First Iemma ministry as an assistant minister, before becoming a separate portfolio in 2011 in the O'Farrell ministry. The portfolio was not tasked with the management of a department.

In the second Perrottet ministry since December 2021 it is one of four portfolios in the health sector working with the Minister for Health, Brad Hazzard. The current minister Bronnie Taylor also holds the portfolio of regional health. The fourth portfolio, regional youth is currently held by Ben Franklin. Together they administer the health portfolio through the Health cluster, including the Ministry of Health and a range of other government agencies, including local health districts and the NSW Ambulance service.

List of ministers

 Assistant ministers  Assistant ministers

References

Mental Health